Hudson and Wardrop was formed by Philip Burgoyne Hudson and James Hastie Wardrop in 1919. Hudson was born in Auckland, New Zealand on 6 February 1887 and died in 1952 at the age of 64. James Wardrop was born in 1891 and died on 25 July 1975 at the age of 84. Both architects were veterans who served in the war and moved on to study under Charles D'Ebro. The Australian established architects are well known for their designs of chapels, universities, colleges, factories, hotels, and public monuments in Melbourne, the Shrine of Remembrance being the most prominent out of the few. They were also responsible for the compiling of The National War Memorial of Victoria: the first brochure on the first permeated design.

Hudson & Wardrop
After forming an alliance in 1919, Hudson and Wardrop entered the competition for the national War Memorial in 1923 and won first prize. The Shrine is known to be Melbourne’s most important Public Monument. The design for the shrine was based on the Parthenon in Athens and the tomb of Mausolus, the Mausoleum of Halicarnassus and symbolizes both the democratic tradition for which the soldiers died and the eternity of their afterlife. In 1929 Hudson and Wardrop partnered with Architect and Engineer Kingsley Ussher particularly to check calculations for the ‘eye of light’ at the shrine.
In 1946 Robert F. Howden joined the firm as junior partner. A year later Stevenson joined to form Hudson Stevenson Partners. The sudden death of Hudson and the illness of Stevenson lead Howden to run the practice.
Hugh McLean joined, renaming the firm Hudson Stevenson Howden & McLean. Howden became senior partner followed by the death of Stevenson and the firm became both Architects and engineers. It was renamed Howden and McLean and now continues as Howden & Wardrop Pty Ltd, Architects & Engineers at 24 Albert Road South Melbourne.

Personal lives

Phillip Burgoyne Hudson was the son of Charles Hudson, Railway Commissioner of Victoria. As a child he attended Wellington College in New Zealand and moved to The Friends College High School to continue his education in his early teens. In 1903 Hudson moved to Melbourne and attended Melbourne University to pursue a career in Architecture.

In 1904 Hudson was articled to Anketell Henderson in 1904 and began a practice with D’Ebro over the period of 1904-09. Soon after he established a practice of his own in 1909. Hudson also began teaching architectural drafting with Harold Desbrowe-Annear and Haddon at the Working Mens College, now known as RMIT University.

A year later, he met Ethel Elise Vincent and was married on 14 December 1910. Ethel gave birth to one son and two daughters and lived in their home in Garden Vale which was designed by Hudson himself in 1914.

Born in 1891, James Hastie Wardrop was enlisted in A.I.F. in October 1915, and served in Europe before traveling to England to study briefly in 1919.

Notable projects

Philip Hudson 

1914: Own house at Garden Vale
Villa at Garden Vale.
Victoria House apartments 220 Clarendon Street, East Melbourne.

1915: Geelong grammar school chapel in association with Gerard Wight
Villa in Lansell Road, Toorak.

1924: National War memorial - Shrine of Remembrance, Melbourne in association with James Wardrop.
1933: Extension to factory Spencer Street, Melbourne.
Conversion of existing building, corner of Moore & Kavanagh streets.
2-storey home in Toorak.

1934: Doctors quarters, Austin Hospital.
South wing to Geelong College.
House in Moorakyne Avenue, Malvern.

1936: Melbourne University Union Building.
Electrolux factory, Alexandra Avenue, South Yarra [demolished]

1937: Boarding house at Geelong College.
1938: Conversion of warehouse on corner of Degraves street & Flinders Lane.
1939: Commercial Union building 411-3 Collins Street.
Mackie House, Geelong College

James Wardrop
1924: Shrine of Remembrance, Melbourne. in association with Philip Hudson
Own two-storey house in 24 Alston Grove, East St. Kilda. A very similar design was also at Number 39 Balaclava Road, East St Kilda.

1934: Flats in Broadway ('Belmac' in Elwood)
1937: Alkira House, Queen Street, City.
1938: Trumold Tyre Workshop (Now 'Mossquito' Restaurant), Queens Parade, Clifton Hill.
United Kingdom Hotel (now McDonald's), Queens Parade, Clifton hill.

1939: Flats 'Shirley Court' 135 Mooltan Street Travancore, Flemington.
2-storey house, Broadford.

Awards and achievements
In 1907 Hudson won a RIVA Silver Medal for an Art Gallery competition, and in 1915 went on to win first prize in the competition to design the Geelong Grammar School’s chapel in association with Gerard Wight. He received a second RIVA silver medal in 1920 and was nominated as the president of RIVA from 1924 to 1926. In 1924 he won the most notable prize for the international competition for National War memorial - Shrine of Remembrance, Melbourne in association with James Wardrop.

In 1911 Wardrop won the RIVA silver medal for his design for the branch bank & Bronze for measured drawings. Two years later he was an elected associate of RIVA.

Notes

Architecture firms of Australia
Architecture firms based in Victoria (Australia)